Florence Township is a township in Burlington County, in the U.S. state of New Jersey. As of the 2020 United States census, the township's population was 12,812, an increase of 703 (+5.8%) from the 2010 census count of 12,109, which in turn reflected an increase of 1,363 (+12.7%) from the 10,746 counted in the 2000 census.

Florence was incorporated as a township by an act of the New Jersey Legislature on March 7, 1872, from portions of Mansfield Township. The township was named for Florence, Italy.

History

The Florence City Company, formed in 1849, organized the original layout of lots and streets in Florence. It also oversaw construction of the Florence Hotel and wharf. The Florence Iron Works was established in 1857 along the Delaware River by Richard Jones.  It continued as a major force in the economy of the community, especially after ownership was transferred to Richard D. Wood in 1867. The 1900 United States Census reported that a good portion of the workforce was dependent on the foundry.

Florence was soon recognized as an attractive vacation spot with sandy beaches.  Visitors could also partake of hydrotherapy offered by a center established about 1872 by Dr. Trall of Philadelphia.

Geography
According to the United States Census Bureau, the township had a total area of 10.17 square miles (26.35 km2), including 9.77 square miles (25.30 km2) of land and 0.41 square miles (1.05 km2) of water (3.98%).

Florence CDP (with a 2010 Census population of 4,426) and Roebling (3,715) are unincorporated communities and census-designated places (CDPs) located within the township. As of the 2000 Census, the CDP's population was 8,200. Up to and including the 2000 United States Census, the two CDPs had been combined as Florence-Roebling, which had a total population of 8,200 in 2000.

Other unincorporated communities, localities and place names located partially or completely within the township include Bustleton, Dobbins, Florence Station and Hoffner's Tract.

The township borders Bordentown Township, Burlington Township, Mansfield Township, Springfield Township in Burlington County; and Bristol Township, Falls Township and Tullytown across the Delaware River in Pennsylvania.

Demographics

2010 census

The Census Bureau's 2006–2010 American Community Survey showed that (in 2010 inflation-adjusted dollars) median household income was $75,219 (with a margin of error of +/− $3,776) and the median family income was $88,479 (+/− $5,289). Males had a median income of $54,010 (+/− $3,496) versus $47,707 (+/− $2,587) for females. The per capita income for the borough was $32,871 (+/− $1,737). About 1.4% of families and 2.5% of the population were below the poverty line, including 4.1% of those under age 18 and none of those age 65 or over.

2000 census
As of the 2000 United States census there were 10,746 people, 4,149 households, and 2,891 families residing in the township. The racial makeup of the township was 85.52% White, 9.74% African American, 0.18% Native American, 2.35% Asian, 0.01% Pacific Islander, 0.65% from other races, and 1.54% from two or more races. Hispanic or Latino of any race were 2.35% of the population.

There were 4,149 households, out of which 33.0% had children under the age of 18 living with them, 51.9% were married couples living together, 13.1% had a female householder with no husband present, and 30.3% were non-families. 25.0% of all households were made up of individuals, and 9.0% had someone living alone who was 65 years of age or older.  The average household size was 2.58 and the average family size was 3.10.

In the township the population was spread out, with 25.2% under the age of 18, 7.5% from 18 to 24, 31.9% from 25 to 44, 23.6% from 45 to 64, and 11.9% who were 65 years of age or older.  The median age was 37 years. For every 100 females, there were 91.7 males.  For every 100 females age 18 and over, there were 87.1 males.

The median income for a household in the township was $56,843, and the median income for a family was $67,412. Males had a median income of $45,325 versus $31,215 for females. The per capita income for the township was $23,529.  About 4.8% of families and 6.1% of the population were below the poverty line, including 6.3% of those under age 18 and 7.5% of those age 65 or over.

Economy
Given the accessibility of Florence to various rail and highway corridors, the township's economy is tied to its evolving role as a center for logistics. Florence and nearby towns in Burlington County have become prominent regional warehouse centers, attracting corporations like Amazon to build such facilities there.

Government

Local government 
Florence Township is governed within the Faulkner Act (formally known as the Optional Municipal Charter Law) under Plan F of the Mayor-Council system of municipal government. implemented based on the recommendations of a Charter Study Commission as of January 1, 1972. The township is one of 71 municipalities (of the 564) statewide that use this form of government. The governing body is comprised of the Mayor and the five-member Township Council. Voters participate in partisan elections held in odd-numbered years to choose a Mayor for a four-year term along with two councilmembers at-large and then two years later choose one councilmember from each of three wards for overlapping terms of four years. The legislative power is vested in the Council and the Executive power is vested in the Mayor. The Mayor appoints a professionally qualified business administrator with the advice and consent of Council.

, the Mayor of Florence Township is Republican Craig H. Wilkie, whose terms of office ends December 31, 2023. Members of the Florence Township Council are Council President Bruce Garganio (at-large; R, 2023), Council Vice President Paul C. Ostrander (at-large; R, 2023), Frank K. Baldorossi Jr. (Ward 1; D, 2025), Nicholas P. Haas Jr. (Ward 2; R, 2025) and Kristan I. Marter (Ward 3; D, 2025).

The Township Administrator is Stephen Fazekas and the Township Clerk is Nancy L. Erlston.

Federal, state and county representation 
Florence Township is located in the 3rd Congressional District and is part of New Jersey's 7th state legislative district.

 

Burlington County is governed by a Board of County Commissioners comprised of five members who are chosen at-large in partisan elections to serve three-year terms of office on a staggered basis, with either one or two seats coming up for election each year; at an annual reorganization meeting, the board selects a director and deputy director from among its members to serve a one-year term. , Burlington County's Commissioners are
Director Felicia Hopson (D, Willingboro Township, term as commissioner ends December 31, 2024; term as director ends 2023),
Deputy Director Tom Pullion (D, Edgewater Park, term as commissioner and as deputy director ends 2023),
Allison Eckel (D, Medford, 2025),
Daniel J. O'Connell (D, Delran Township, 2024) and 
Balvir Singh (D, Burlington Township, 2023). 
Burlington County's Constitutional Officers are
County Clerk Joanne Schwartz (R, Southampton Township, 2023)
Sheriff James H. Kostoplis (D, Bordentown, 2025) and 
Surrogate Brian J. Carlin (D, Burlington Township, 2026).

Politics
As of March 2011, there were a total of 7,543 registered voters in Florence Township, of which 2,237 (29.7% vs. 33.3% countywide) were registered as Democrats, 1,851 (24.5% vs. 23.9%) were registered as Republicans and 3,452 (45.8% vs. 42.8%) were registered as Unaffiliated. There were 3 voters registered as Libertarians or Greens. Among the township's 2010 Census population, 62.3% (vs. 61.7% in Burlington County) were registered to vote, including 80.1% of those ages 18 and over (vs. 80.3% countywide).

In the 2012 presidential election, Democrat Barack Obama received 3,354 votes here (55.7% vs. 58.1% countywide), ahead of Republican Mitt Romney with 2,539 votes (42.2% vs. 40.2%) and other candidates with 80 votes (1.3% vs. 1.0%), among the 6,021 ballots cast by the township's 7,971 registered voters, for a turnout of 75.5% (vs. 74.5% in Burlington County). In the 2008 presidential election, Democrat Barack Obama received 3,235 votes here (53.8% vs. 58.4% countywide), ahead of Republican John McCain with 2,656 votes (44.2% vs. 39.9%) and other candidates with 73 votes (1.2% vs. 1.0%), among the 6,015 ballots cast by the township's 7,452 registered voters, for a turnout of 80.7% (vs. 80.0% in Burlington County). In the 2004 presidential election, Democrat John Kerry received 2,703 votes here (49.7% vs. 52.9% countywide), ahead of Republican George W. Bush with 2,682 votes (49.3% vs. 46.0%) and other candidates with 32 votes (0.6% vs. 0.8%), among the 5,439 ballots cast by the township's 6,817 registered voters, for a turnout of 79.8% (vs. 78.8% in the whole county).

In the 2013 gubernatorial election, Republican Chris Christie received 2,651 votes here (63.8% vs. 61.4% countywide), ahead of Democrat Barbara Buono with 1,365 votes (32.9% vs. 35.8%) and other candidates with 46 votes (1.1% vs. 1.2%), among the 4,153 ballots cast by the township's 7,975 registered voters, yielding a 52.1% turnout (vs. 44.5% in the county). In the 2009 gubernatorial election, Republican Chris Christie received 2,130 votes here (49.2% vs. 47.7% countywide), ahead of Democrat Jon Corzine with 1,866 votes (43.1% vs. 44.5%), Independent Chris Daggett with 217 votes (5.0% vs. 4.8%) and other candidates with 52 votes (1.2% vs. 1.2%), among the 4,332 ballots cast by the township's 7,538 registered voters, yielding a 57.5% turnout (vs. 44.9% in the county).

Education
The Florence Township School District serves public school students in kindergarten through twelfth grade. As of the 2018–19 school year, the district, comprised of three schools, had an enrollment of 1,581 students and 128.1 classroom teachers (on an FTE basis), for a student–teacher ratio of 12.3:1. Schools in the district (with 2018–19 enrollment data from the National Center for Education Statistics) are 
Roebling Elementary School with 396 students in grades K–3, 
Riverfront Middle School with 694 students in grades 4–8 and 
Florence Township Memorial High School with 452 students in grades 9–12.

Students from Florence Township, and from all of Burlington County, are eligible to attend the Burlington County Institute of Technology, a countywide public school district that serves the vocational and technical education needs of students at the high school and post-secondary level at its campuses in Medford and Westampton Township.

Media
WIFI, 1460 AM, is a radio station broadcasting out of Florence Township. It has an urban contemporary format.

Transportation

Roads and highways

Florence hosts a  section of Interstate 95 (New Jersey Turnpike Pennsylvania Extension), which extends from the border with Burlington Township on the west side of the township to the border with Mansfield Township on the east. One interchange, known as "6A" but not actually signed with a number, connects I-95 with U.S. Route 130, which follows a southwest-northeast alignment through Florence. This interchange previously connected with Cedar Lane in an unusual roadway setup (where Cedar Lane overpasses itself) the locals termed the "whirlybird" until 1999, when the Authority constructed a double-trumpet interchange directly with US 130. The 6 toll gate is just east of Exit 6A on the Pennsylvania Extension. Interchange 6 (itself) is located in Mansfield Township.

Interstate 295 also passes through Florence Township, but the nearest interchanges are in Mansfield Township and Burlington Township. County Route 543 also traverses Florence, passing over Interstate 295 without an interchange.

Public transportation
The NJ Transit River Line light rail system offers service in the township at the Florence station at U.S. Route 130 and Roebling station at Hornberger Avenue providing southbound service to Camden and the Walter Rand Transportation Center (with transfers available to the PATCO Speedline) and northbound service to the Trenton Rail Station with connections to NJ Transit trains to New York City, SEPTA trains to Philadelphia, and Amtrak trains on the Northeast Corridor.

NJ Transit provides bus service on the 409 route between Trenton and Philadelphia.

BurLink bus service is offered on the B5 route between the Florence light rail station and Haines Industrial Center.

Notable people

People who were born in, residents of, or otherwise closely associated with Florence Township include:

 Joseph Bodner (1925–1982), painter and illustrator
 John E. Dimon (1916–1993), member of the New Jersey Senate from 1991 until his death
 Heath Fillmyer (born 1994), professional baseball pitcher for the Kansas City Royals
 Adam Hughes (born 1967), comic book artist best known for his pinup-style renderings of female character including Wonder Woman and Catwoman
 Richard J. Hughes (1909–1992), politician who served as the 45th Governor of New Jersey, from 1962 to 1970 and as Chief Justice of the New Jersey Supreme Court from 1973 to 1979
 Wali Lundy (born 1983), running back who played in the NFL for the Houston Texans
 Gia Maione (1941–2013), singer who was the wife of singer Louis Prima
 Gene Olaff (born 1920), former U.S. Soccer goalkeeper and former Superintendent of the New Jersey State Police
 Scott Semptimphelter (born 1972), professional football quarterback who played for six seasons in the Arena Football League
 John A. Sweeney (born 1941), politician who served a single two-year term in the New Jersey General Assembly from 1974 to 1976
 Curtis Thompson (born 1996), track and field athlete who specializes in the javelin

References

External links

Official website
Florence Township School District
History of Florence and Roebling 

Data for the Florence Township School District, National Center for Education Statistics
Flashes Football

 
1872 establishments in New Jersey
Faulkner Act (mayor–council)
Populated places established in 1872
Townships in Burlington County, New Jersey
New Jersey populated places on the Delaware River